Miles: The New Miles Davis Quintet is an album by jazz musician Miles Davis released in April 1956 on Prestige Records, catalogue 7014. It is the debut record by the Miles Davis Quintet, and generally known by the original title Miles as indicated on the cover.

Background 
In the summer of 1955, Davis performed a noted set at the Newport Jazz Festival, and had been approached by Columbia Records executive George Avakian, offering a contract with the label if he could form a regular band. Davis assembled his first regular quintet to meet a commitment at the Café Bohemia in July. By September, the line-up stabilized to  include John Coltrane on tenor saxophone, Red Garland on piano, Paul Chambers on bass, and Philly Joe Jones on drums.

Still under contract to Prestige, an arrangement dating back to January 1951, Davis convinced Avakian to buy out his contract with Prestige. The terms of the deal between Avakian and Weinstock allowed Davis to record for Columbia but not release any of the material until Davis fulfilled his remaining duty to Prestige. Davis took the quintet into Columbia's studio first, on October 26, to record titles that would be issued on Round About Midnight. Three weeks later the quintet entered the studio of Rudy Van Gelder in Hackensack, New Jersey, yielding the six titles for this album. During the following year, Davis and his quintet would record enough material over two Van Gelder sessions to yield Cookin', Relaxin', Workin', and Steamin' and fulfill their contractual obligation to Prestige.

Content 
The songs were a mix of pop and jazz standards, items familiar enough to present few problems to the fledgling band, given the Prestige policy of offering no compensation for rehearsal time. "The Theme" would continue to be Davis' standard set closer, and Coltrane does not play on "There Is No Greater Love".

Track listing

Side one

Side two

Personnel 
Miles Davis – trumpet
John Coltrane – tenor saxophone
Red Garland – piano
Paul Chambers – bass
Philly Joe Jones – drums

See also 
Albums recorded by the same personnel:
 'Round About Midnight (1957)
 Cookin' (1957)
 Relaxin' (1958)
 Workin' (1960)
 Steamin' (1961)

References 

1956 albums
Miles Davis albums
Prestige Records albums
Albums produced by Bob Weinstock
Albums recorded at Van Gelder Studio